RUSSH is a quarterly, independent Australian fashion magazine established in 2004.  The magazine primarily focuses on fashion, art and music. In 2018, Russh was listed by StyleCaster as one of the "21 International Fashion Magazines That Should Be on Your Radar."

History 
Russh was launched in 2004 and the first issue appeared in October 2004. In 2010 the website of the magazine  was launched. It is published four times per year. The magazine previously published an international edition in Japan.

Russh exclusively uses fashion models for its covers. Past cover models have included Cara Delevingne, Julia Nobis, Daul Kim, Alessandra Ambrosio, Tony Ward, Karlie Kloss, Hannah Holman, Jacquelyn Jablonski, Ali Stephens, Karmen Pedaru, Constance Jablonski, Catherine McNeil, Ashley Smith, Devon Aoki and Enikő Mihalik.

Maddie Ziegler was its first digital cover model in 2022.

References

External links 
 

Women's magazines published in Australia
Bi-monthly magazines published in Australia
Independent magazines
Magazines established in 2004
Women's fashion magazines
2004 establishments in Australia
Magazines published in Sydney